Jenynsia is a genus of freshwater fishes in the family Anablepidae. Like Anableps species, they are onesided livebearers: some sources indicate that they only mate on one side, right-"handed" males with left-"handed" females and vice versa. However other sources dispute this. These South American fish are viviparous.

Distribution
Species of the genus are distributed in the Río de la Plata Basin and Atlantic coastal drainages from Río Negro Province, Argentina, to the city of Rio de Janeiro, Brazil, and in the Andean drainages of northwest Argentina and southern Bolivia.

Taxonomy
Jenynsia is the sister group to the genus Anableps and both are classified in the subfamily Anablepinae; together with the genus Oxyzygonectes they compose the family Anablepidae. Jenynsia contains two subgenera. Members of the subgenus Plesiojenysia Ghedotti, 1998, are distributed in the uplands of southern Brazil. Members of the subgenus Jenynsia are more widely distributed in southern South America, with one species, J. sanctaecatarinae also found in the uplands of southern Brazil. Members of the two subgenera are partially sympatric in southeastern Brazil.

Description
Unlike their cousins Anableps, their eyes are normal. Jenynsia species are diagnosable by the possession of an unscaled tubular
gonopodium formed chiefly by the third, sixth, and seventh anal-fin rays and by the possession of tricuspid teeth in the outer mandibular series in adults. The maximum length in these species is up to 12 centimetres (5 in) in females and about 4 cm (2 in) in males.

Species
There are currently 15 recognized species in this genus:
 Jenynsia alternimaculata (Fowler, 1940)
 Jenynsia darwini Amorim, 2018
 Jenynsia diphyes Lucinda, Ghedotti & da Graҫa, 2006
 Jenynsia eigenmanni (Haseman, 1911)
 Jenynsia eirmostigma Ghedotti & S. H. Weitzman, 1995
 Jenynsia lineata (Jenyns, 1842) (Onesided livebearer)
 Jenynsia luxata Aguilera, Mirande, Calviño & Lobo, 2013
 Jenynsia maculata Regan, 1906
 Jenynsia multidentata (Jenyns, 1842) (Rio de la Plata onesided livebearer)
 Jenynsia obscura (Weyenbergh (de), 1877)
 Jenynsia onca Lucinda, R. E. dos Reis & Quevedo, 2002
 Jenynsia sanctaecatarinae Ghedotti & S. H. Weitzman, 1996
Jenynsia sulfurica 
 Jenynsia tucumana Aguilera & Mirande, 2005
 Jenynsia unitaenia Ghedotti & S. H. Weitzman, 1995
 Jenynsia weitzmani Ghedotti, A. D. Meisner & Lucinda, 2001

References

Anablepidae
Viviparous fish
Freshwater fish of South America
Freshwater fish of Argentina
Fish of Bolivia
Freshwater fish of Brazil
Taxa named by Albert Günther